is a railway station in the city of Toyoake,  Aichi Prefecture, Japan, operated by Meitetsu. Local, Express and Semi Express trains has stops at Zengo station.

Lines
Zengo Station is served by the Meitetsu Nagoya Main Line and is 49.8 kilometers from the terminus of the line at Toyohashi Station.

Station layout
The station has two elevated island platforms connected by a footbridge with the station building underneath. The station has automated ticket machines, Manaca automated turnstiles and is staffed.

Platforms

Adjacent stations

Station history
Zengo Station was opened on 1 April 1923 as a station on the Aichi Electric Railway. On 1 April 1935, the Aichi Electric Railway merged with the Nagoya Railroad (the forerunner of present-day Meitetsu).

Passenger statistics
In fiscal 2015, the station was used by an average of 20,033 passengers daily. .

Surrounding area
 Japan National Route 1

See also
 List of Railway Stations in Japan

References

External links

 Official web page 

Railway stations in Japan opened in 1923
Railway stations in Aichi Prefecture
Stations of Nagoya Railroad
Toyoake, Aichi